Metrosideros polymorpha, the ōhia lehua, is a species of flowering evergreen tree in the myrtle family, Myrtaceae, that is endemic to the six largest islands of Hawaii. It is a member of the diverse Metrosideros genus, which are widespread over the southwest Pacific.

It produces a brilliant display of flowers, made up of a mass of stamens, which can range from fiery red to yellow. Many native Hawaiian traditions refer to the tree and the forests it forms as sacred to Pele, the volcano goddess, and to Laka, the goddess of hula. Ōhia trees grow easily on lava, and are usually the first plants to grow on new lava flows.

Metrosideros polymorpha is commonly called a lehua tree, or an ōhia lehua, or simply an ōhia; all are correct. There is a widespread but mistaken notion that the Hawaiian word ōhia only refers to the tree and that the word lehua only refers to its flowers.

Distribution
Metrosideros polymorpha is the most common native tree in the Hawaiian Islands, tolerating a wide range of soil conditions, temperature, and rainfall. It is relatively slow growing. Dominant in cloud forests above , the tree is also common in seasonally wet forests, where it may be dominant or form mixtures with the native Acacia koa.

Habitat

Metrosideros polymorpha may occur as a tall tree or a prostrate shrub, and everything in between. Preferred soils are acidic to neutral (pH 3.6-7.4) and either a Histosol, Mollisol, Podsol, Oxisol, Ultisol, or Alfisol.

The trunk varies in form. In some trees, it is straight and smooth; in others, it is twisted and prominently fluted. Trees growing in forests often have stilt roots, having germinated on logs or the stems of fallen hāpuu (Cibotium tree ferns), which have long decayed away when the tree has reached maturity. Some trees have fibrous aerial roots to gather moisture. At high elevations, and in areas with poor soils or little rainfall, shrub forms are the norm. Flowers are usually bright to medium red but orange-red, salmon, pink, yellow, or orange forms are also found. The flowers appear in clusters on the terminal ends of the branches. Masses of stamens extend from the flower and give the blossoms their characteristic pom-pom shape. The stomata of the leaves are able to close up in the presence of harmful gases, which gives it an advantage over many non-native trees.

Uses

The reddish brown heartwood of M. polymorpha is very hard, fine textured, and has a specific gravity of 0.7 . In native Hawaiian society, it is used in house and heiau construction, as well as to make papa kui ai (poi boards), weapons, tool handles, hohoa  (round kapa beaters), and kii (statues and idols). Although the trunk of ōhia is not used to make the kaele (hull) of waa (outrigger canoes), it was used for their nohona waa (seats), pale (gunwales), and pola (decking). Wae (spreaders) were made from the curved stilt roots of ōhia. Pā (fencing) was made from the wood due to its availability; kauila (Colubrina oppositifolia or Alphitonia ponderosa), more durable woods when in contact with soil, was rarer. As the wood burns hot and cleanly, it is excellent wahie (firewood). The lehua (flowers) and  liko lehua (leaf buds) are used in making lei. The flowers were used medicinally to treat pain experienced during childbirth.

Ōhia lehua is one of the few honey plants that is native to the Hawaiian Islands.

Similar species
There are about 50 species in the genus Metrosideros in Southeast Asia and the Pacific and as well one species in South Africa.  The Hawaiian Islands are home to five species of Metrosideros that are endemic to the islands, meaning they are found nowhere else in the world. These are: Metrosideros polymorpha, M. macropus, M. rugosa, M. tremuloides, and M. waialealae. The species are readily distinguished from one another by the characteristics of their leaves.

Metrosideros kermadecensis, from the Kermadec Islands north of New Zealand, has recently become naturalized on Maui and may become a pest species. Several cultivars of M. excelsa, the pohutukawa tree of New Zealand, have been sometimes planted as ornamentals in Hawaii but are not reported to have naturalized. Metrosideros polymorpha was originally classified as a variety of M. collina, native to Rarotonga, Tahiti, and other islands of Polynesia, but now is generally accepted as a distinct Hawaiian endemic species.

Conservation

Metrosideros polymorpha forests in Hawaii have been invaded by myriad alien species. In the wet forests these include the strawberry guava (Psidium littorale), albizia (Falcataria moluccana), and "purple plague" (Miconia calvescens). In drier areas, problematic invaders include faya tree (Myrica faya) and Christmasberry (Schinus terebinthifolius). Alien grasses such as meadow ricegrass (Ehrharta stipoides) may form an understory that prevents or inhibits natural regeneration of the forests. In drier areas, M. polymorpha has to compete with silk oak (Grevillea robusta) and fountain grass (Pennisetum setaceum).

Rapid ʻōhiʻa death 

More recently, a strain of fungus initially identified as Ceratocystis fimbriata has attacked the ʻōhiʻa forests of the Big Island, causing rapid ʻōhiʻa death. The disease gets this name because healthy trees appear to die within a few days to a few weeks. While ōhia itself remains extremely abundant, some species that depend on it such as the akekee (Loxops caeruleirostris) and longhorn beetles in the genus Plagithmysus have become endangered due to forest areas shrinking.

In April 2018, the cause of rapid ʻōhiʻa death was identified as two species of Ceratocystis previously unknown to science: C. huliohia and C. lukuohia. By May 2018, infected ʻōhiʻa trees were found on the island of Kauai, prompting requests that members of the public limit transportation of ʻōhiʻa products within the island.

Etymology
It is a common misconception that the word ōhia is used to refer to the tree and that the word lehua refers only to its flowers. The Hawaiian Dictionary describes lehua with these words:
 "The flower of the ōhia tree ... also the tree itself" .
Thus endorsing the common practice of referring to Metrosideros polymorpha as a lehua tree, or as an ōhia lehua, or simply an ōhia.

The genus name Metrosideros is derived from the Greek words metra, meaning 'heartwood', and sideron, meaning 'iron', and refers to the hard wood of the trees in this genus.  The specific epithet polymorpha, meaning 'many forms', is very appropriate, since individuals of this species exhibit many different morphologies and inhabit a broad range of ecological situations.  The Hawaiian language word ōhia is thought to have been derived from the ancestral Proto-Oceanic word, *kafika.  Throughout Oceania, there are many similar-sounding words that were also derived from the same ancestral protoform and, in most cases, they are names for the "mountain apple", or "Malay apple" tree, Syzygium malaccense. In the Hawaiian Islands, however, the word ōhia is not only used to refer to Syzygium malaccense, but also to other species of Syzygium and Metrosideros that occur there.

The derivation of the word lehua is more obscure, and while there are many opinions regarding its origin, there has been, to date, no historical linguistic study of the word to provide convincing evidence for any particular etymology.

Mythology
In Hawaiian mythology, Ōhia and Lehua were two young lovers. The volcano goddess Pele fell in love with the handsome Ōhia and approached him, but he turned down her advances. In a fit of jealousy, Pele transformed Ōhian into a tree. Lehua was devastated by this transformation and out of pity the other gods turned her into a flower and placed her upon the ōhia tree. Other versions say that Pele felt remorseful but was unable to reverse the change, so she turned Lehua into a flower herself. It is said that when a lehua flower is plucked from an ōhia tree, the sky will fill with rain representing the separated lovers' tears.

References

Sources

External links

polymorpha
Endemic flora of Hawaii
Trees of Hawaii
Biota of Hawaii (island)
Biota of Kauai
Biota of Lanai
Biota of Maui
Biota of Molokai
Biota of Oahu
Flora without expected TNC conservation status